Daniel Obbekjær (born 16 July 2002) is a Danish professional footballer who plays as a centre-back for Faroese club 07 Vestur.

Early life
Obbekjær started playing football at the age of 4 in Næsby Boldklub, before joining Odense Boldklub 10 years later.

Club career

OB
In January 2019, Obbekjær went on training camp in Turkey with the OB first team. On 1 April 2019 it was confirmed, that 16-year old Obbekjær had signed his first professional contract until the summer 2021 and was promoted permanently to the first team squad. At the end of the month, Obbekjær got his professional debut for OB against F.C. Copenhagen. Obbekjær started on the bench but replaced Mathias Greve in the 64th minute which made him the third youngest debutant in the club's history. In October 2019, Obbekjær became the youngest Danish Superliga starter in OB's history at the age of 17 years and 94 days.

In January 2020, 17-year old Obbekjær went on a trial at Premier League klub Brighton & Hove Albion after being scouted by the club.

On 22 January 2021, Obbekjær joined Italian Serie B side S.P.A.L. on loan for the rest of the season, with an option to buy. He was registered for the clubs Primavera (U19) team.

After returning to OB, Obbekjær didn't feature on OB's first team list. In July 2021, he went on a trial at Hobro IK, however, he returned without being offered a contract. With Obbekjær's contract with OB expiring at the end of 2021, he was sent to the U19, as he was not registered for the first team.

York United
On 5 January 2022, Obbekjær signed a two-year contract with Canadian Premier League side York United, with options until 2025.

07 Vestur
In June 2022, he joined  07 Vestur in the Faroe Islands.

References

External links
Daniel Obbekjær at DBU

Living people
2002 births
Association football defenders
Danish men's footballers
Danish expatriate men's footballers
Næsby Boldklub players
S.P.A.L. players
Odense Boldklub players
York United FC players
Danish Superliga players
Denmark youth international footballers
Expatriate footballers in Italy
Danish expatriate sportspeople in Italy
Expatriate soccer players in Canada
Danish expatriate sportspeople in Canada